Cordyline congesta, commonly known as narrow-leaved palm lily (not to be confused with C. stricta, also known by this common name) is an evergreen Australian plant. Growing north from the Clarence River, New South Wales.

Leaves long and thin to lanceolate. Small white to mauve flowers form on panicles. Flowering occurs from September to October. Fruit an orange-red berry,  in diameter, ripening from December to March. This species propagates easily from seeds, suckers or stem cuttings.

Similar to Cordyline stricta and C. rubra; however, C. congesta has jagged, fringed or scolloped leaf margins, particularly near the leaf base.

References 

congesta
Plants described in 1827
Flora of New South Wales
Asparagales of Australia
Flora of Queensland